Hussin Ututalum Amin (born October 3, 1951) is a Filipino politician, scholar and current mayor of Jolo, capital of Sulu Province in the Autonomous Region in Muslim Mindanao (ARMM). He served three consecutive terms as representative of Sulu's 1st District (1998–2007).

Background
Amin was born in Bus-bus, Jolo and attended university at the Philippine Muslim College in Jolo (Bachelor of Arts in History, 1972) and the University of the East (Bachelor of Laws, 1978). He served in the Philippine Army in Zamboanga.

Personal life
He has twelve children namely: Khuzaima Amin married to Khalil Gibran Yusah, Zharalyn Amin, Charmaine Amin, Abdel Razi Amin, Khifreen Amin, Nurhusna Amin married to Morsid Estino, Hussin Amin II, Fatima Yusra Amin, Moneeza Amin, Tasmeem Amin, Sayeed Hussin Amin, and Mohammad Zain Amin and Fatima Hassina Johan Amin.

References

1951 births
Living people
People from Sulu
Mayors of places in Sulu
Members of the House of Representatives of the Philippines from Sulu
Filipino Muslims